Homaxinella is a genus of sea sponges in the family Suberitidae. The type species is Homaxinella balfourensis.

Description
Homaxinella was originally included in the sponge family Axinellidae but the structure of the skeleton shows that it lacks a reticulation and has bundles of calcareous spicules at the surface which led to its inclusion in Suberitidae. The members of the genus are rooted to the substrate and have stalks, a much branched habit of growth and an axially condensed choanosomal skeleton. They have an extra-axial skeleton of bundles of megascleres which are exclusively styles, and a profusion of further incoherently arranged styles, in a wide range of sizes. There are no microscleres.

Species
The World Porifera Database recognises the following species:
Homaxinella amphispicula (de Laubenfels, 1961)
Homaxinella balfourensis (Ridley & Dendy, 1886)
Homaxinella brevistyla Hoshino, 1981
Homaxinella ensifera (Lamarck, 1815)
Homaxinella erecta (Brøndsted, 1924)
Homaxinella flagelliformis (Ridley & Dendy, 1886)
Homaxinella infundibula Tanita & Hoshino, 1989
Homaxinella ramosimassa Tanita & Hoshino, 1989
Homaxinella subdola (Bowerbank, 1866)
Homaxinella tanitai Hoshino, 1981

References

Suberitidae